Tom Walters is an American politician and a Republican member of the Wyoming House of Representatives representing District 38 since January 8, 2013. Walters was a candidate for the Wyoming Senate District 30 seat in 2004 and 2008.

Education
Walters graduated from Kelly Walsh High School in 1994, and earned his BS from the University of Wyoming.

Elections
2012 When Republican Representative Bob Brechtel ran for Wyoming Senate and left the House District 38 seat open, Walters won the August 21, 2012 Republican Primary with 958 votes (69.5%), and was unopposed for the November 6, 2012 General election, winning with 3,585 votes.
2004 Walters challenged incumbent Senator Charles Scott for the Senate District 30 seat. Walters lost the August 17, 2004 Republican Primary to Scott; Scott won the November 2, 2004 General election.
2008 Walters challenged Senator Scott in a rematch in the August 19, 2002 Republican Primary, but again lost to Scott. Scott was unopposed for the November 4, 2008 General election and has held the seat since 1983.

Personal Life
Walters is the son of Donald and Betty Walters, he is the oldest of three kids. Walters is married to Kade Walters, he manages a ranch outside of Casper.

References

External links
Official page at the Wyoming Legislature
 

Place of birth missing (living people)
Year of birth missing (living people)
Living people
Republican Party members of the Wyoming House of Representatives
People from Natrona County, Wyoming
University of Wyoming alumni
21st-century American politicians